Albert, Count of Nassau-Dillenburg (1 November 1596 in Dillenburg – 16 June 1626 in Quakenbrück) was a son of Count George of Nassau-Dillenburg and his first wife, Anna Amalia of Nassau-Saarbruucken.  After his father died in 1623, he ruled Nassau-Dillenburg jointly with his elder brother Louis Henry until Albert died himself in 1626.

Counts of Nassau
House of Nassau
1596 births
1626 deaths
17th-century German people